The City Municipality of Murska Sobota is one of twelve city municipalities of Slovenia. It lies in northeastern Slovenia and was established in 1994. Its seat is the town of Murska Sobota. The area belongs to the traditional region of Prekmurje and has been included in the Mura Statistical Region since 1995.

Settlements

In addition to the municipal seat of Murska Sobota, the municipality also includes the following settlements:

 Bakovci
 Černelavci
 Krog
 Kupšinci
 Markišavci
 Nemčavci
 Polana
 Pušča
 Rakičan
 Satahovci
 Veščica

References

External links

City Municipality of Murska Sobota on Geopedia
Official site

 
Murska Sobota
1994 establishments in Slovenia